Sidney Homer, Sr. (9 December 1864 – 10 July 1953) was a classical composer, primarily of songs.

Biography
Homer was the youngest child born to deaf parents in Boston, Massachusetts on December 9, 1864 (some sources use 1865). He attended the 1884 class of Phillips Academy in Andover, Massachusetts, but did not attend college, although he studied composition with George Whitefield Chadwick and with Josef Rheinberger in Munich. He married contralto Louise Dilworth Beatty in 1895. 

Sidney and Louise had six children, including twin daughters Anne Homer and Kathryn Homer, son Sidney Homer, Jr. (economist and author), and daughter Louise Homer. 

Sidney Homer died on July 10, 1953 in Winter Park, Florida.

Legacy
Sidney Homer's influence included his mentoring and supporting his nephew, the composer Samuel Barber.  Scholarship on Homer was a particular focus of musicologist Harry Colin Thorpe.

Homer composed many of his songs with the voice of his famous wife in mind. Among his most famous songs are "A Banjo Song" (Weeden), "Requiem" (Stevenson), "Casey at the Bat" (Thayer), and "The House that Jack Built" ("Mother Goose.")

Homer's memoir, My Wife and I, was published by Macmillan in 1939 and reprinted by Da Capo Press in 1978.

Notes

External links

Sidney Homer page at The Lied and Art Song Texts Page
Sidney Homer scores (the composer's manuscripts) in the Music Division of The New York Public Library for the Performing Arts
The Songs of Sidney Homer
Sheet music for "Plantation Hymn", G. Schirmer, New York, from the Alabama Sheet Music Collection
Sidney Homer page at Song of America

1864 births
1953 deaths
19th-century American composers
19th-century American male musicians
19th-century classical composers
20th-century American composers
20th-century American male musicians
20th-century classical composers
American classical composers
American male classical composers
Classical musicians from Massachusetts
People from Winter Park, Florida
Phillips Academy alumni
Burials in Warren County, New York